Television Magic was a very early American television series that aired in 1932. 

Broadcast in New York City on experimental station W2XAB (now WCBS-TV), it was broadcast on a mechanical television system. The series was first announced in the September 17, 1932 edition of The New York Sun, with the article "Best Features on Television".  The article stated that "Edwin Howard will bring vaudeville magic to television" and "card tricks and the difficult needle stunt will be given their initial trial over television".

Scheduling
For some episodes, Television Magic aired at 8:00PM on Wednesday and was the first show on the day's schedule. It was followed by baseball scores for one minute and then a performance by dancer Grace Voss.

References

External links
Television Magic on IMDb

1930s American television series
1932 American television series debuts
1932 American television series endings
American live television series
Lost American television shows
American television magic shows
Black-and-white American television shows